Illinois Route 111 (IL 111) is an  north–south state highway in the southwestern part of the U.S. state of Illinois.

Route description 
IL 111 has concurrencies with IL 3 in Alton, U.S. Route 67 (US 67) in Godfrey, and IL 267 from Godfrey to Medora.

History 
In August 1960, a new alignment in Alton on what is now the Homer M. Adams Parkway opened to traffic from IL 100 to IL 140. A second new alignment, Bellwood Road Extension in Bethalto, opened a few years later that would link IL 111 up with Vaughn and Central in Wood River. The original alignment of IL 111 in Alton had it cut up Sixth Street in Wood River, Old Alton–Edwardsville Road (with a concurrency with then-IL 159), and up Broadway in Alton until its concurrency with US 67 using Belle Street.

SBI Route 111 originally traveled from Waverly to Alton on modern-day IL 111. In 1942, it was extended south to Fairmont City. In 1953, it was extended further south to near East Saint Louis, which became Centreville. In 2001, when US 67 was moved west through Jerseyville, IL 267 took its place north of Medora. Some time after, IL 267 was applied south along with IL 111 on a concurrency.

Major intersections

See also

References 

111
Transportation in St. Clair County, Illinois
Transportation in Madison County, Illinois
Transportation in Jersey County, Illinois
Transportation in Macoupin County, Illinois
Transportation in Morgan County, Illinois
Alton, Illinois